Courtney L. Pugmire Meldrum (born January 31, 1977) is a long-distance runner from the United States, who specializes mainly in the 3000 metres steeplechase. She is a former world record holder in this obstacle race, clocking 10:23.47 on June 23, 1996, in Atlanta, Georgia.

References
SteepleChics

1977 births
Living people
American female long-distance runners
American female steeplechase runners
World record setters in athletics (track and field)
21st-century American women